Denis Lawson (11 December 1897 – 23 May 1968) was a Scottish footballer who played as an outside-right.

He started playing professionally for St Mirren in 1920; in 1923 he moved to Cardiff City of the English Football League and played 64 matches for them, before moving to the United States and playing for Springfield Babes and Providence F.C. He returned to British football in 1927–28 with a move to Wigan Borough, and then finished his career back in Scotland with Clyde and Brechin City.

In 1923 Lawson was capped for Scotland, in a 2–2 draw with England at Hampden Park.

References 

1897 births
1968 deaths
Sportspeople from Lennoxtown
Scottish footballers
Scotland international footballers
Scottish Football League players
Scottish Junior Football Association players
English Football League players
St Mirren F.C. players
Cardiff City F.C. players
American Soccer League (1921–1933) players
Springfield Babes players
Providence Clamdiggers players
Wigan Borough F.C. players
Clyde F.C. players
Association football outside forwards
Scottish expatriate sportspeople in the United States
Expatriate soccer players in the United States
Scottish expatriate footballers